Iris iberica subsp. lycotis is a subspecies of Iris iberica within the genus iris and family iridaceae.

Description 
Plants possess a stem that grows up to 30cm tall. This species flowers from April to June. Flowers are dark purple and heavily veined.

Distribution and habitat 
Iris iberica subsp. lycotis is native to Turkey, Iran, Iraq and South Caucasus.

This species inhabits dry, rocky soils in sloped mountain habitats.

References 

iberica subsp. lycotis
Plant subspecies